The 1970 California Golden Bears football team was an American football team that represented the University of California, Berkeley in the Pacific-8 Conference (Pac-8) during the 1970 NCAA University Division football season. In their seventh year under head coach Ray Willsey, the Golden Bears compiled a 6–5 record (4–3 against Pac-8 opponents), finished in a tie for second place in the Pac-8, and were outscored by their opponents by a combined total of 272 to 249.

At home for the Big Game, Cal defeated #11 Stanford  the Pac-8 champion led by Heisman Trophy winner  On New Year's Day, Stanford upset undefeated Ohio State in the Rose Bowl and quarterback Plunkett was the first pick in the 1971 NFL Draft.

California's statistical leaders included Dave Penhall with 1,785 passing yards, Stan Murphy with 603 rushing yards, and Steve Sweeney with 679 receiving yards.

Schedule

Roster

References

California
California Golden Bears football seasons
California Golden Bears football